G. K. Mani is, the president of Pattali Makkal Katchi completing more than 25 years as president of PMK party. G.K. Mani's name was proposed by PMK founder Dr. S. Ramadoss during the party's general body meeting in 1998 for President's post in PMK. Later the same year, he was  elected by votes for the PMK's President.     
 
G. K. Mani, was born in Govindapadi Village, Kolathur, Salem District. He started his social life as teacher in Govt. Aided School. Later on he joined the Social Service Society (SSS), later this forum has been extended and formed as Vanniyar Sangam, founded by Dr. S. Ramadoss.  
 
In 1984, G. K. Mani, was first one to be elected as Union Chairman for Kolathur, Salem Dt under the Vanniyar Sangam Banner. He is the first political representative from Vanniyar Sangam even before the PMK party was formed  
and currently a member of the Tamil Nadu Legislative Assembly, Tamilnadu state Assembly elected from Pennagaram constituency in 2021 assembly election and three times from Pennagaram constituency, in 1996, 2001, 2021 and one time from Mettur Constituency in 2006. 

He was teacher by profession and left his job and got involved in the Vanniyar reservation protest which happened during late 1980's and became an active leader in Vanniyar Sangam and which later extended to political party, Pattali Makkal Katchi. By his hard and tireless work, he became president of Pattali Makkal Katchi and completed his Silver Jubilee year's celebration.

References

Further reading 

Pattali Makkal Katchi politicians
Living people
National Democratic Alliance candidates in the 2014 Indian general election
Tamil Nadu MLAs 1996–2001
Tamil Nadu MLAs 2001–2006
Tamil Nadu MLAs 2006–2011
People from Salem district
Year of birth missing (living people)
Tamil Nadu MLAs 2021–2026